Oleg Yuryevich Kapustnikov (born 5 May 1972) is a retired Kazakhstani professional footballer. He made his professional debut in the Soviet Second League in 1990 for FC Meliorator Chimkent.

References

1972 births
Living people
Russian footballers
Soviet footballers
Kazakhstani footballers
Kazakhstan international footballers
Kazakhstani expatriate footballers
Russian Premier League players
Ukrainian Premier League players
Kazakhstan Premier League players
FC Metalurh Zaporizhzhia players
FC KAMAZ Naberezhnye Chelny players
FC Taraz players
FC Zvezda Irkutsk players
Expatriate footballers in Ukraine
Kazakhstani expatriate sportspeople in Ukraine
Association football forwards